The Houghton Weavers are an English folk music band formed in 1975, in Westhoughton, Bolton, Greater Manchester (historically part of Lancashire), England. The current band members are David Littler (acoustic guitar, banjo, mandolin, banjo-ukulele, bouzouki, piano accordion and vocals), Steve Millington (bass guitar, keyboards, acoustic guitar, piano accordion and vocals) and Jim Berry (guitar, harmonica and vocals).

David Littler is a founder member of the band, Steve Millington joined in 1996, and Jim Berry joined in 2017. Jim's brother Tony Berry had been a founder member of the band but died in June 2019.

Previous members were Norman Prince (1975 to 1999, acoustic guitar, banjo, 12 string guitar, bass guitar and vocals), David James Hughes (1974 to 1977) bass guitar, John Oliver (1975 to 1976 vocals), Dennis Littler (1976 to 1984 bass guitar and vocals), Jeff Hill (1984 to 1996 and 1999 to 2007 bass guitar, acoustic guitar, 12 string guitar, electric guitar and vocals), and Tony Berry (1975 to 2019, vocals). Whilst never officially a member of the band, Alan Fawkes was a frequent guest - "he couldn't stand the drop in pay" (dates unknown: woodwind instruments).
 
They sing mainly English folk music, much of it in Lancashire dialect, as well as folk versions of easy listening hits. The group demonstrate an eclectic range of song subjects including "The Blackpool Belle", "Uncle Joe’s Mint Balls" and "The Lion of Vienna" in accolade of footballer Nat Lofthouse.
 
They are best known for their BBC TV show Sit Thi Deawn (Lancashire dialect for "have a seat", referring to the hospitality of Lancashire people). The programme ran for six series or seven years and was a mixture of easy listening music and comedy for a local audience. The group also starred in six of their own series for BBC Radio 2.

History
In 2014, lead singer Berry was unable to perform due to throat cancer and attended as a sound mixer. On 14 June 2019, it was reported that Tony Berry had died due to pancreatic cancer.

Quotations
"With 'folk' you either think of something like the Houghton Weavers, or proper folk." – Andy Kershaw

Selected discography

References

External links
Official Website

English folk musical groups
Musicians from the Metropolitan Borough of Bolton
Musical groups from Greater Manchester
People from Westhoughton